Shellflower may refer to:

Any of several plants in the genus Alpinia; e.g. Alpinia nutans, and Alpinia zerumbet
Any of several plants in the genus Chelone, e.g. Chelone glabra
Any of several plants in the genus Moluccella, specially Moluccella laevis
Any of several plants in the genus Tigridia
Pistia stratiotes, the sole species in the genus Pistia.